Fodhdhoo (Dhivehi: ފޮއްދޫ) is one of the inhabited islands of Noonu Atoll.

History

Toponymy
The island is named after the Fonga Gas (tree) which was one of a king in the world. It was visited by many foreign traveler, and the island's Feili (a cloth worn by Maldivians) was known as Dhera Feili.

Geography

Demography

References

Islands of the Maldives